The 1946 Buffalo Bisons season was their inaugural season in the All-America Football Conference. The team finished 3-10-1, failing to qualify for the playoffs.

The team's statistical leaders included quarterback George Terlep with 574 passing yards, fullback Vic Kulbitski with 605 rushing yards, and end Fay King with 466 receiving yards. Right halfback Steve Juzwik and fullback Lou Zontini tied for the team scoring lead with 42 points each.

Season schedule

Division standings

Roster
Players shown in bold started at least one game at the position listed as confirmed by contemporary game coverage.

References

Buffalo Bills (AAFC) seasons
Buffalo Bisons
Buffalo Bisons